All That You Are may refer to:

 "All That You Are" (Goo Goo Dolls song), 2011
 "All That You Are" (Econoline Crush song), 1997
 "All That You Are" (Mudvayne song), 2005